Super-Session is an album by pianist Tommy Flanagan, bassist Red Mitchell, and drummer Elvin Jones recorded in 1980 for the Enja label.

Reception

AllMusic awarded the album 3 stars, stating: "the musicians communicate quite well (Flanagan and Jones had played together back in the mid-'50s in Detroit) and often think as one. Fine straight-ahead music."

Track listing
All compositions by Tommy Flanagan except where noted.
 "Django" (John Lewis) – 6:05
 "Minor Perhaps" – 6:43
 "Too Late Now" (Burton Lane) – 9:38
 "I Love You" (Cole Porter) – 7:03
 "Rachel's Rondo" – 6:03
 "Things Ain't What They Used to Be" (Mercer Ellington, Ted Persons) – 6:24

Personnel 
Tommy Flanagan – piano
Red Mitchell – bass
Elvin Jones – drums

References 

1980 albums
Tommy Flanagan albums
Enja Records albums